Ngao (ง้าว,ของ้าว) is a pole weapon that was traditionally used during the 18th century in Thailand.

Polearms
Weapons of Thailand

References